Joseph Hart (1712–1768) was a Calvinist minister and hymnwriter.

Joseph Hart may also refer to:

Joseph Hart (artist) (born 1976), American artist
Joseph Hart (entertainer) (1861–1921), American vaudeville performer and songwriter
Joseph Binns Hart (1794–1844), English organist and composer
Joseph C. Hart (1798–1855), American writer
Joseph Hubert Hart (born 1931), American prelate of the Roman Catholic Church
Joseph Johnson Hart (1859–1916), U.S. Representative from Pennsylvania
Joe Hart (born 1987), English footballer
Joe Hart (politician) (1944-2022), American politician, Arizona state mine inspector, and former state representative
Joe Hart (Glee), a character on the Glee television series

See also
Joel Hart (disambiguation)